Comparative European Politics is a quarterly peer-reviewed academic journal focusing on comparative politics and the political economy of the whole of contemporary Europe within and beyond the European Union.

The journal is published by Palgrave Macmillan and the current joint editors-in-chief are Colin Hay (Sciences Po), Ben Rosamond, (University of Copenhagen) and Martin A. Schain, (New York University).

Abstracting and indexing 
The journal is abstracted and indexed in:

According to the Journal Citation Reports, the journal has a 2015 impact factor of 1.261, ranking it 47th out of 163 journals in the category "Political Science".

See also 
 List of political science journals

References

External links 
 

English-language journals
Palgrave Macmillan academic journals
Political science journals
Publications established in 2003
Quarterly journals